Swami Madhavananda (born Nirmal Chandra Basu; 15 December 1888–6 October 1965) was the ninth President of the Ramakrishna Math and Ramakrishna Mission.

Biography 
Madhavananda was born in Baghanchra in the Nadia district of West Bengal by father, Hariprasad Basu.

Madhavananda graduated from the University of Calcutta with distinction. During his student life, he read the works of Vivekananda and was inspired by the ideals and messages of Ramakrishna and Vivekananda. He was initiated by the Holy Mother at Jayrambati in March 1909. He joined the monastery at Chennai in January 1910. Madhavananda was also initiated into sannyasa by Swami Brahmananda  in January 1916. Later, he was joined by his younger brother Vimal, who also joined the Order; he came to be known as Swami Dayananda and founded the Ramakrishna Mission Seva Pratishthan in Kolkata in 1932.

Madhavananda spent a few years at the Udbodhan office, assisting in the publication of the journal. He was later sent to Mayavati as the head of the Advaita Ashrama. He started a Hindi-language organ of the Order called Samanvaya, with the assistance of the Hindi poet, Suryakant Tripathi, 'Nirala'. Madhavananda was instrumental in spreading the ideals of Ramakrishna and Vivekananda in Gujarat and in the founding of the Rajkot Center. Moreover, he was sent to the United States to preach at the San Francisco monastery.

Madhavananda became a trustee of the Ramakrishna Math and a member of the governing body of the Ramakrishna Mission in 1922. He was called back to India in 1929 to serve as a Joint Secretary of the Order. He was appointed General Secretary in May 1938 and remained in that position until he was appointed Vice President in March 1962. His tenure as general secretary was an all-time high of 24 years. After the demise of Vishuddhananda, he became the President of the Order on August 4, 1962. As the President of the Order, Madhavananda presided over the Birth Centenary Celebrations of Vivekananda in 1963.

Madhavananda was austere and used to practice japa and meditation for hours. He translated many scriptures, like the Brihadaranyaka Upanishad, the Brahma Sutras, and the Bhasha Paricchheda.

Madhavananda died on Wednesday, 1965, at the age of 76 years and ten months.

Related links
 Ramakrishna Mission Institute of Culture, Gol Park, Presidents of the Ramakrishna Order - Swami Madhavananda
 Six Lighted Windows - Swami Yogeshananda

Bibliography

External links

 Swami Madhavananda - Ninth President, Biography at Ramakrishna Mission
 Swami Madhavananda's English translation of Vivekachudamani
 
 

Presidents of the Ramakrishna Order
Indian religious writers
Indian Sanskrit scholars
1888 births
1965 deaths
People from Nadia district
University of Calcutta alumni
Scholars from West Bengal
20th-century Indian translators
Monks of the Ramakrishna Mission
Missionary linguists